A first date is the first meeting between two people with the aim of each assessing the other's suitability as a romantic partner.

First date may also refer to:

Television
 First Dates, British dating series
 First Dates (Australian TV series)
 First Dates (Canadian TV series)
 First Dates (Irish TV series)
 First Dates (American TV series)
 "First Date" (Buffy the Vampire Slayer), a 2003 episode of Buffy the Vampire Slayer
 "First Date" (Frasier), an episode of Frasier
 "First Date" (That '70s Show episode), an episode of That '70s Show
 "First Date" (Whitney), an episode of Whitney

Music
 "First Date" (Blink-182 song), 2001
 "First Date" (50 Cent song), 2012
 First Date (musical), a 2012 musical
 First Date, a teen horror book by R. L. Stine
 "First Date", a song from the WALL-E movie soundtrack composed by Thomas Newman